A theatrical technician, also known as a theatrical tech, theatre technician, or theatre tech is a person who operates technical equipment and systems in the performing arts and entertainment industry. In contrast to performers, this broad category contains all "unseen" theatrical personnel who practice stagecraft and are responsible for the logistic and production-related aspects of a performance including designers, operators, and supervisors.

Typical positions
Theatrical responsibilities taken by technicians include:
 Set construction and theatrical carpentry
 Sound system configuration and operation
 Lighting design and light board operation, Followspot operation, hanging and maintenance of stage lighting instruments as well as various other electrical jobs
 Flying of scenery and occasionally even actors by fly men
 Rigging of moveable and stationary set pieces by riggers
 Stage management
 Costume and prop management
 Operation of Special effects including fog machines and pyrotechnics

A single theatrical technician may regularly do one or more of the above jobs during load in, load outs (strike), rehearsal and performance. Performance technicians are generally divided between those backstage (stagehands, Stage Managers) and those in a control room (lighting and audio technicians). During load in and load out additional crew members may be needed due to the amount of work required to be completed in a short time span. Larger and more complex shows require larger crews and often personnel with specialized advanced skills to perform these job functions.

The position may be volunteer or a paid position. It is not uncommon to receive compensation (such as comp/free tickets to the current or future productions or items used in the show) in other forms than money for pay. This type of compensation allows the person working to receive value for their services while not costing the producer more out-of-pocket expenses. Theatrical technicians are represented by the International Alliance of Theatrical Stage Employees in the United States.

Stagecraft classifications
Stagecraft and technicians can be classified into departments and jobs as follows. Not all productions will have all departments or jobs filled, and, in many cases, one technician will perform multiple jobs (even if only possessing one title).

 Technical Director – This person will typically oversee the carpentry, rigging, lighting and props departments as a liaison to the performance's primary director. Depending on the production, a "TD" may also supervise the audio and pyrotechnics departments. In smaller performances and venues, this position is commonly taken by the show's director, assistant director, or stage manager. In addition, non-resident venues (those that host touring or temporary performances rather than long-term productions) generally have an in-house Technical Director who oversees incoming event load-in, and a technical liaison between the venue's owner/manager and the director of the performance.

Carpentry
This is the general name for all work involving scenery, including the deck (floor) of the stage.
 Master Carpenter – Although there may be multiple Master Carpenters in a scene shop, typically a performance or tour will only have one. This technician will typically report directly to the Technical Director.
 Carpenter – Multiple carpenters may be attached to a single show, and report to the Master Carpenter. These technicians are responsible both for assembling and building the scenery as well as moving scenic elements during scene shifts. Often these technicians also function as stagehands.

Electrics
This department is responsible for all of the onstage lighting for a show including, but not limited to, practicals, stage lighting and followspots. Electricians are responsible for the assembly, installation, operation and maintenance of the lighting for a production. The Electrics department is also typically in charge of any fog or haze machines used during a production, as well as the configuration of pyrotechnics and other special hardware.

 Master Electrician – The head of the Electrics department on a show, who typically reports directly to the Technical Director, but also sometimes to the Lighting Designer during the development phase of a show.
 Head Followspot Operator – In some shows, a separate technician gives all cues to the follow spot operators to reduce the stage manager's workload.
 Light board operator – The person who operates the light board and controls all the stage lights during a show. In smaller performances and venues, may be the Lighting Designer or the Master Electrician.
 Electrician – Multiple electricians may be assigned to a single show. On touring shows, this can be a general designation, with specific positions as follows:
 Deck Electrician – Responsible for all electric elements on the stage floor, including roving instruments, fog machines, practicals or lighting installed into scenic pieces. Also, in some shows (usually dance productions), where it is sometimes necessary to swap the color media on lighting instruments during the performance or re-focus lights that a performer may have bumped into, the Deck electrician may be responsible for these swaps. 
 Followspot Operators – These technicians operate one or more followspots to track performers during a show.

Rigging

This department is responsible for all equipment hung (flown) in the theater space. This department varies greatly from show to show, sometimes being absorbed into the Electrics or Carpentry departments. If the production incorporates personnel flying (such as in the staging of Peter Pan), there will usually be designated riggers specifically trained in flying actors. Rigging techniques and traditions come from sailing. Sailors were considered the earliest stagehands in history and many techniques used today for rigging in the theater are from standard uses on boats. Theater technicians today have also incorporated techniques from mountain climbers as well to improve the capabilities of flying equipment in the air. 
 Rigger – The general term for persons in this department. If a rigger is specifically assigned to a certain department, they will have a title referencing that department (Electrics Rigger).
 Flyman – Specific term normally used with counterweight rigging system for an operator of the linesets for those systems.
 Head Flyman – The senior technician in charge of the operations of a counterweight rigging system.

Rigging systems

A theater consists of four basic rigging systems such as: hemp house, single purchase, double purchase and truss. Proper knowledge of the basic rigging systems by theater technicians is how scenery is properly built and hung over people's heads for productions. The hemp house is where all the ropes are housed in the theater and are counterweighted with sandbags. Whereas a single purchase is where the loading floor is on the stage floor in order to reduce the amount of staged space in the wings. A double purchase system works quite differently compared to a single purchase because it puts the loading floor halfway between the stage floor and the loft blocks. The truss is considered as to be the most important rigging system in theater because it consists of two or more pieces of pipe fabricated together with cross bracing. The purpose of the truss is to replace standard pipes for extremely heavy loads to be lifted.

Properties
The properties department is responsible for all hand and scenic props for a show. This usually includes furniture, weaponry and consumables (paper, food and drink) for a production. In addition to the above duties, the props department is responsible for the cleanliness of the stage floor, including sweeping and mopping of the stage surface.
 Propsmaster/Propsmistress – The head of the Properties department. Will also usually be in charge of purchasing or building the props for a show.
 Prop Runner – Those who must move scenic props on (and off) stage or supply actors with their props during the show. This job is often unnecessary in small shows.
 This position may also be referred to as a set dresser.

Audio
The audio department is responsible for all sound production for a show, including the configuration of microphones, speakers and control equipment, as well as the production of any necessary audio tracks. Personnel in this department include:

Sound designer or audio engineer, responsible for the configuration of the venue's sound system as a whole, including the placement and designation of microphones, monitors, loudspeakers, and control hardware. This position is often held by an acoustician, especially in large performances requiring musical or orchestral sound reinforcement.
Sound operator, responsible for the live mixing of the performance's audio at a master sound board. Often referred to as A-1 to designate the first (highest) position of the production Audio department. This technician is generally positioned in the back of the audience space, so as to hear the performance's audio directly rather than be forced to use a monitoring system, and is responsible for maintaining volume for performers and musicians while avoiding feedback and other problems.
A-2, or audio assistant, responsible for the maintenance and monitoring of audio equipment used by the sound operator (specifically any lavalier microphones used in the performance). Depending on performance size, this technician may perform other duties, including the operation of audio media devices. In smaller performances, this position is often taken by a stagehand rather than a technician trained in audio.

Pyrotechnics/special effects
A rarely seen department in theatre due to the heavy restrictions on the use of true pyrotechnics and is sometimes combined with other tech departments (usually the Electrics department) is referred to as special effects. Theatrical technicians are responsible for the production and operation of explosives, special effects and illusions on sufficiently large theatrical productions. Today many of the special effects used on stage have been modernized and are extremely advanced the most commonly used effects are nature, fire, fog and haze. In order to make special effects seem more realistic on stage technicians use innovative techniques and special equipment to bring the production to life across the stage. For nature effects like wind, fans are commonly used to bring movement on stage by adjusting the speed and direction of the fan. For effects like fire, equipment is brought in to create flames and smoke and is usually operated by a licensed special effects operator. Whereas fog and haze machines are easy and accessible for technicians to use and only require fluid to be placed inside the machine to vaporize into fog and haze. These machines also have functions where the flow and speed of the fog and haze can be adjusted to control how its distributed throughout a production.

Stage management
The stage manager is in control of a production during its run. Responsibilities include calling the cues and determining the starting time of the show and ensuring the safety of all persons involved. Depending on circumstances, multiple positions are possible:
 Production Manager – Typically seen on touring shows or larger permanent venues, this is usually the most senior member of the stage management staff.
 Stage Manager – The usual title applied to the head stage manager assigned to a specific production. This will also be the person who will run a show during performances.
 Deputy Stage Manager – Also known as "Call Boy" is responsible for calling technical (lighting, sound, fly, av etc.) cues at certain times read from the prompt copy (Cue Script).
 Assistant Stage Manager – Reports to the Stage Manager, usually assisting backstage or onstage during a production.
 Repertory Stage Manager – Used occasionally if one stage manager oversees multiple productions being performed in repertory. During any one production, would fulfill the duties assigned to the Stage Manager as above.
 Production Assistant – Used in Equity houses (Actor's Equity Association is the union for Stage Managers), this is the non-union equivalent of an Assistant Stage Manager
 Deck Stage Manager – Used in some shows to specifically refer to the Assistant Stage Manager on the deck during a performance.

Wardrobe
Responsible for the creation and maintenance of costume pieces and dressing the performers.
Costume Designer
Assistant Costume Designer
 Wardrobe Mistress/Master – The head of the wardrobe department during a production
 Dresser/Wardrobe Crew – General Wardrobe technician during a show that assists the performers in dressing and performing quickchanges.
 Draper
 Tailor 
 Costumer – Person responsible for the creation of all costumes for a show. Similar to a Technical Director for the Wardrobe, Hair and Makeup departments.
 Milliner – Seen occasionally, this person is responsible for the creation of headwear for a show.
 Wardrobe Crafts – Sometimes found as a separate department or a sub-department of Wardrobe, this department is responsible for the creation of masks, headdresses or non-standard costumes for a production.
 Hair/Makeup – Twin departments responsible for the makeup, wigs and hair stylings for a show.

See also
Stagecraft

References

Stage crew
Theatrical sound production
Theatrical occupations
Technicians